This is the complete list of Pan American Games medalists in taekwondo from 1987 to 2015.

Men's events

50 kg

54 kg

58 kg

64 kg

68 kg

70 kg

76 kg

80 kg

+80 kg

83 kg

+83 kg

Women's events

43 kg

47 kg

49 kg

51 kg

55 kg

57 kg

60 kg

65 kg

67 kg

+67 kg

70 kg

+70 kg

References

Taekwondo